Llewellyn Simpkin Hook (4 May 1905 – 4 August 1979) was a New Zealand rugby union player. Small in stature, at 1.70 metres tall and weighing 63 kg, he played in a range of positions, included at flanker, wing-forward, and anywhere in the backline from first five-eighth to fullback. He played 12 games for the All Blacks, including one as captain, and appeared in three Test matches.

References

1905 births
1979 deaths
Auckland rugby union players
New Zealand international rugby union players
New Zealand rugby union players
People educated at Thames High School
Rugby union centres
Rugby union flankers
Rugby union fullbacks
Rugby union players from the Auckland Region
Rugby union wings
Waikato rugby union players